Elena Whitham (née McLeod, born 9 July 1974) is a Scottish politician who has been a Member of the Scottish Parliament (MSP) for Carrick, Cumnock and Doon Valley since 2021. A member of the Scottish National Party (SNP), she was appointed as Minister for Community Safety in November 2022 by First Minister Nicola Sturgeon. 

As a childhood emigrant to Quebec, Whitham returned to Scotland in the 1990s. She worked for Scottish Women's Aid before becoming a councillor for Irvine Valley in East Ayrshire Council, and then Depute Leader of the council.

Early life
Elena McLeod was born on 9 July 1974 in Kilmarnock. At the age of six, she and her family emigrated to Quebec, Canada due to her father struggling to find employment in Scotland. Whitham's family were miners in Muirkirk and agricultural workers at many local farms from Sorn to Coylton. She had become a supporter of the principle of sovereignty after being given a copy of The Proclaimers album Sunshine on Leith by her grandmother in 1988.

Whitham studied at the Champlain College Saint-Lambert in Montreal from 1990 to 1992. In 1993, She attended the Concordia University, where she gained a Bachelor of Arts in Journalism and Communications. In the 1995 Quebec independence referendum, she campaigned in-favour of Quebec sovereignty.

After graduating, she returned to Scotland to work as a freelancer in local media. She then worked in community support roles in Ayrshire, where her family has deep roots. For over ten years she was a Scottish Women's Aid worker in Ayrshire, assisting victims of domestic abuse.

Political career

Local government 
On 1 October 2015 she was first elected to East Ayrshire Council in a by-election for the Irvine Valley ward. She became Depute Leader of the council, and was also national housing and homelessness lead for the Convention of Scottish Local Authorities.

Member of the Scottish Parliament 
In October 2020 she was confirmed as a candidate for Scottish Parliament. On 8 May 2021 she was elected as Member of the Scottish Parliament (MSP) for Carrick, Cumnock and Doon Valley.  Her majority of 4,337 votes (12.2%) was lower than that achieved in 2016 by her predecessor Jeane Freeman.

Minister for Community Safety 
In November 2022, it was announced that Whitham would succeed Ash Regan as Minister for Community Safety, subject to parliamentary approval.

Personal life 
Whitham is the mother of two children.

References

External links 
 
 profile at East Ayrshire Council

1974 births
Date of birth missing (living people)
Living people
Scottish National Party councillors
Members of the Scottish Parliament 2021–2026
Scottish National Party MSPs
Female members of the Scottish Parliament
Councillors in Ayrshire
People associated with East Ayrshire
Scottish emigrants to Canada
Quebec sovereigntists
Immigrants to Quebec
21st-century British women politicians
Women councillors in Scotland